The 6th AARP Movies for Grownups Awards, presented by AARP the Magazine, honored films released in 2006 made by people over the age of 50. The ceremony was held at the Hotel Bel-Air in Los Angeles on February 6, 2007. Alan Arkin won the inaugural Career Achievement Award, and Terry Bradshaw won the award for Breakaway Accomplishment for his performance in Failure to Launch.

This was the first year to feature five nominees in the Best Actress category, and the last year in which candidates were not nominated for Supporting Actor or Supporting Actress.

Awards

Winners and Nominees

Winners are listed first, highlighted in boldface, and indicated with a double dagger.

Career Achievement Award
 Alan Arkin

Breakaway Accomplishment
 Terry Bradshaw: "The Hall of Fame quarterback and Fox NFL Sunday host comes awfully close [to stardom] in this, his first major film role... He's riotously exasperated as a dad with a stay-at-home son — but the real eyeopener is the tenderness of his performance with the wonderful Kathy Bates as his wife."

Films with multiple nominations and wins

References

AARP Movies for Grownups Awards
AARP